m:tel a.d. Banja Luka (formerly Telekom Srpske a.d. Banja Luka) is a telecommunications company based in Banja Luka, Republika Srpska, Bosnia and Herzegovina. The company is owned by Telekom Srbija, and is the second largest telecommunications company in Bosnia and Herzegovina and the biggest one listed on the Banja Luka Stock Exchange, with the market capitalisation of about 540 million euros.

History
Telekom Srpske was established on 20 December 1996. It was privatized in 2006, through a public tender. Telekom Srbija, made the highest bid with 646 million euros for a 65% majority stake, while the second highest bidder was Telekom Austria with an offer of 467 million euros.

The Government of Republika Srpska declared Telekom Srpske a company of strategic importance and, therefore, the state capital has been privatised according to the special privatisation program enacted by the Government. Raiffeisen Investment was appointed as the financial advisor to the government. The criteria that potential bidders had to fulfil, included a current minimum of 800,000 fixed-line and 1.5m mobile users, suggesting that the Government is hoping for an outside operator who is capable of investing in Telekom Srpske's infrastructure.

The company's main business is fixed and mobile telecommunications in domestic and international traffic. Other businesses include: 
 directory inquires
 internet services provider
 design, construction, reconstruction and installation of TC devices, etc.

Ownership structure
The ownership structure of the company is as follows (as of 31 December 2017):
 Telekom Srbija - 65.01%
 Pension and Disability Insurance Fund - 8.92%
 Restitution Fund - 5.03%
 DUIF Krist.Invest a.d. - 3.30%
 Other shareholders - 17.74%

Subsidiaries
The company owns the founding status shares in three companies, with a 100% ownership of the company "Telekard telefonske usluge", d.o.o. Banja Luka and TT "Inženjering" d.o.o. Banja Luka, and 20% of share in the Institute for International Law and International Cooperation, d.o.o. Banja Luka.

References

External links
 

Telecommunications companies of Bosnia and Herzegovina
Companies based in Banja Luka
Telecommunications companies established in 1996
1996 establishments in Bosnia and Herzegovina
Economy of Bosnia and Herzegovina
Economy of Republika Srpska